The 2017–18 Women's EHF Challenge Cup is the 21st edition of the European Handball Federation's third-tier competition for women's handball clubs, running from 14 October 2017.

Overview

Team allocation
TH: Title holders

Qualification stage

Round 2
Teams listed first played the first leg at home. Bolded teams qualified into round 3.

|}
Notes

a Both legs were hosted by Stockerau.

Round 3
Teams listed first played the first leg at home. Some teams agreed to play both matches in the same venue. Bolded teams qualified into last 16.

|}
Notes

a Both legs were hosted by Rincón Fertilidad Málaga.
b Both legs were hosted by Kristianstad.
c Both legs were hosted by MKS Selgros Lublin.
d Both legs were hosted by ADA Colegio João Barros.
e Both legs were hosted by HC Naisa Niš.
f Both legs were hosted by Virto/Quintus.
g Both legs were hosted by AC Alavarium / Love Tiles.
h Both legs were hosted by Zagnosspor.
i Both legs were hosted by HB Dudelange.

Knockout stage

Last 16
Teams listed first played the first leg at home. Some teams agreed to play both matches in the same venue. Bolded teams qualified into quarterfinals.

|}
Notes
a Both legs were hosted by AZERYOL Handball Club.
b Both legs were hosted by HC Lokomotiva Zagreb.
c Both legs were hosted by Virto/Quintus.
d Both legs were hosted by MKS Selgros Lublin.

Quarterfinals
Teams listed first played the first leg at home. Bolded teams qualified into semifinals.

|}
Notes
a Both legs were hosted by Rocasa Gran Canaria ACE.
b Both legs were hosted by Rincón Fertilidad Málaga.

Semifinals

|}

Final

|}

See also
2017–18 Women's EHF Champions League
2017–18 Women's EHF Cup

Women's EHF Challenge Cup
EHF Challenge Cup
EHF Challenge Cup